Flight 494 may refer to:
 Eastern Airlines Flight 494, experienced uncommanded deployment of reverse thrust on 21 April 1985
 Precision Air Flight 494, crashed on 6 November 2022

0494